Sammy Hagar & Friends is the sixteenth studio album by American hard rock musician Sammy Hagar, released on September 24, 2013, by Frontiers Records.

"I was going to do an anthology called Four Decades of Rock," he told Classic Rock, "cherrypicking songs from Montrose, my solo stuff, Van Halen, the stuff I've done since. I was going to write a new song for each era: a song like 'Rock Candy' by Montrose, a song like 'Red' from my solo years, a Van Halen-type song… [But] I went to license the Van Halen songs, and those two knuckleheads [Eddie and Alex Van Halen] wouldn't okay it… I could have hired an attorney and done it anyway, because I own thirty per cent of that music. But that would have got a bunch of ugly press."

Track listing

Notes 
 The live bonus tracks were recorded at "A Concert for Ronnie Montrose", a posthumous tribute show at the Regency Ballroom in San Francisco, California on April 27, 2012.

References 

2013 albums
Sammy Hagar albums
Frontiers Records albums
Collaborative albums